Sébastien Ruette (born ) is a retired Canadian male volleyball player. He was part of the Canada men's national volleyball team at the 2002 FIVB Volleyball Men's World Championship in Japan. He played for Paris Volley, France.

Clubs
 Paris Volley, France (2002)

References

1977 births
Living people
Canadian men's volleyball players
Place of birth missing (living people)